Samuel Louis Silas (born September 25, 1940 in Homeland, Florida) is a former American football defensive lineman in the National Football League. Drafted by the Boston Patriots in the sixth round (46th overall) of the 1963 AFL Draft.  He went to one Pro Bowl during his eight-year career, and was selected to one All-Pro team. Silas played for the Portland Storm of the World Football League in 1974. 

After his career in football, was a professor at William Paterson University in New Jersey. He taught  fitness for life, swimming, self-defense, racquetball and conditioning class. He has over 50 years experience in martial arts. He is now retired.

1940 births
Living people
American football defensive linemen
Eastern Conference Pro Bowl players
New York Giants players
Players of American football from Florida
San Francisco 49ers players
Southern Illinois Salukis football players
Sportspeople from Bartow, Florida
St. Louis Cardinals (football) players
Portland Storm players